William John Sweeney (March 6, 1886 – May 26, 1948) was an infielder in Major League Baseball from 1907 to 1914. He graduated from St. Xavier High School in Cincinnati in 1904.

In an eight year major-league career, he compiled a .272 batting average (1,004-3,692) with 442 runs scored, 11 home runs, 388 RBI, 172 stolen bases, an on-base percentage of .349 and a slugging percentage of .344. His best seasons were with the Boston Braves in 1911 and 1912, he hit .314 and .344 with 63 and 99 RBI respectively.

See also
 List of Major League Baseball career stolen bases leaders

References

External links

1886 births
1948 deaths
Baseball players from Kentucky
Boston College Eagles baseball coaches
Boston Braves players
Boston Doves players
Boston Rustlers players
Chicago Cubs players
Major League Baseball second basemen
Major League Baseball shortstops
Major League Baseball third basemen
Portland Beavers players
Portland Giants players
Rock Island Islanders players
St. Xavier High School (Ohio) alumni
Baseball players from Cincinnati
Sportspeople from Covington, Kentucky
Toledo Mud Hens players
Burials at St. Joseph Cemetery (West Roxbury, Massachusetts)